Byron B. Randolph was the Democratic President of the West Virginia Senate from Harrison County and served from 1941 to 1943.

References 

West Virginia state senators
Presidents of the West Virginia State Senate
Year of birth missing
Year of death missing